The Man and The Journey tour was an informal (mostly English) concert tour of a few dates by Pink Floyd during which the conceptual music piece The Man and The Journey was played.

Setlist
At most shows Pink Floyd performed The Man and The Journey, however at some shows this was not performed - these shows had a shorter set which usually included "Astronomy Domine", "Set the Controls for the Heart of the Sun" and unaltered versions of "Careful with That Axe, Eugene" and "A Saucerful of Secrets" as heard on Ummagumma. At concerts in Europe in early 1970, The Man and The Journey was still performed, but in a shorter version.

The Man and The Journey set list

This set list is from the 17 September 1969 show in Amsterdam.

First set

 "Daybreak" ("Grantchester Meadows")
 "Work" (Percussion and vibraphone with musical sawing and hammering)
 "Teatime" (The band members were served tea on stage)
 "Afternoon" ("Biding My Time")
 "Doing It!" (Drum and gong solo, with Farfisa organ and tape effects)
 "Sleep" ("Quicksilver")
 "Nightmare" ("Cymbaline")
 "Labyrinth" (instrumental alarm clock sounds and tape effects)

Second set

 "The Beginning" ("Green is the Colour")
 "Beset by Creatures of the Deep" ("Careful with That Axe, Eugene")
 "The Narrow Way, Part 3"
 "The Pink Jungle" ("Pow R. Toc H.")
 "The Labyrinths of Auximines" (instrumental section of "Let There Be More Light")
 "Footsteps/Doors" (tape effects)
 "Behold the Temple of Light" (beginning of "The Narrow Way, Part 3")
 "The End of the Beginning" ("Celestial Voices")

Encore (when played)

 "Interstellar Overdrive" (May 24 in Sheffield) or "Set the Controls for the Heart of the Sun" (22 June in Manchester and 26 June in London)

Other shows

When The Man and The Journey was not performed, the shows usually contained all or some of the following:

 "Astronomy Domine"
 "Careful with That Axe, Eugene"
 "Interstellar Overdrive"
 "Green Is the Colour"
 "Pow R. Toc H."
 "Set the Controls for the Heart of the Sun"
 "Let There Be More Light"
 "A Saucerful of Secrets"

For the recording of Top Gear for BBC Radio 1, the band performed:

 "Grantchester Meadows"
 "Cymbaline"
 "The Narrow Way, Part 3"
 "Green Is the Colour"
 "Careful with That Axe, Eugene" (truncated version)

This performance was released as part of The Early Years 1965–1972 box set in 2016.

Tour dates

Release 

The 27 April (Birmingham) and 2 May (Manchester) concerts were recorded and parts released on the live half of the Ummagumma album, in November 1969. The recordings from 6 September and 17 September 1969 in Amsterdam was released as part of the boxset, The Early Years 1965-1972 in 2016. It is included in the volume titled 1969: Dramatis/ation. The volume also contains video footage from a rehearsal at the Royal Festival Hall, London on 14 April 1969.

Personnel
David Gilmour – electric and acoustic guitars, percussion, vocals
Roger Waters – bass, nylon-string acoustic guitar, percussion, vocals, vocalisations
Richard Wright – Farfisa organ, vibraphone, trombone, vocals, pipe organs (where available)
Nick Mason – drums, percussion

See also
 Pink Floyd live performances

References 

Pink Floyd concert tours
1969 concert tours